Villefranche–Vernet-les-Bains is a railway station in Villefranche-de-Conflent and about 5 km from Vernet-les-Bains, Occitanie, southern France. Within TER Occitanie, it is part of lines 24 (Villefranche–Vernet-les-Bains↔Perpignan) and 32 (Latour-de-Carol-Enveitg↔Villefranche–Vernet-les-Bains).

See also 

 List of SNCF stations in Occitanie

References

Railway stations in Pyrénées-Orientales
Railway stations in France opened in 1895